Love and Money may refer to:

 Love and Money (band), a Scottish rock/soul/funk band
 Love and Money (album), an album by Eddie Money
 Love and Money (film), a 1982 drama
 Love and Money (play), a play by Dennis Kelly
 Love & Money, an American TV sitcom
 "Love and Money", an episode of the British television sitcom You Rang, M'Lord?

See also
 For the Love of Money (disambiguation)
 For Love or Money (disambiguation)
 Love v Money (disambiguation)
 For Love & Money
 Love of money